The 1996 Japan Open Tennis Championships included this tournament in women's singles. Third-seeded Amy Frazier was the defending champion but lost in the final 7–5, 6–4 against first-seeded Kimiko Date.

Seeds
A champion seed is indicated in bold text while text in italics indicates the round in which that seed was eliminated.

  Kimiko Date (champion)
  Sabine Appelmans (first round)
  Amy Frazier (final)
  Ai Sugiyama (semifinals)
  Naoko Sawamatsu (second round)
  Shi-Ting Wang (first round)
  Yone Kamio (first round)
  Marianne Witmeyer (second round)

Draw

External links
 1996 Japan Open Tennis Championships Draw

Singles